Muslim communities in South Asia apply a system of social stratification. The stratification that operates among Muslims arises from concerns other than in the concepts of pure and impure that are integral to the Hindu caste system. It developed as a result of relations between the foreign conquerors and Upper caste Hindus who converted to Islam (Ashraf) (also known as tabqa-i ashrafiyya) and the local lower caste converts (Ajlaf) as well as the continuation of the Indian caste system among local converts. Non-Ashrafs are lower caste converts. The neologism Pasmandas include Ajlaf and Arzal Muslims, and Ajlafs' statuses are defined by them being descendants of converts to Islam and are also defined by their pesha (profession). These terms are not used in local sociological vocabulary in places such as Kashmir and Uttar Pradesh, and therefore tell us very little about the functioning of Muslim society.

The Biradari System is how social stratification manifests itself in Pakistan, and to an extent also India. Ashrafism, Syedism, Zatism, Sharifism, Biradarism, and the Quom System are aspects of the caste system among Muslims in South Asia. The South Asian Muslim caste system also includes hierarchical classifications of khandan (dynasty, family, or lineage descent) and nasab (a group based on blood ties and lineage).

Historical development 
While Islam requires egalitarianism and does not recognize any castes, only socio-economic classes, when it came to Persia and India, the existing divisions in these regions were adopted among the local Muslim societies.

After Muhammad died in the 7th century, there was the war of succession which had tribes and families fighting each other. After this, a determinant for social stratification in Arab society included being part of the close family of Muhammad. This alleged  determinant had its presence in ancient South Asia among Muslims since the 8th century, and then this allegedly led to a further hierarchical determinant, which was Arabs versus non-Arabs. Later on, among non-Arabs, further divisions took place, between Muslims who were converted in early Islamization campaigns and Muslims who converted more recently. Today, South Asian Muslims are divided by the aforementioned classifications that have resulted in Arab-origin higher castes and those that are descendants of lower castes converts. The Sultans during the Mughal Empire were all high caste.

The Muslims who came to the subcontinent during the 12th century Muslim conquests on the Indian subcontinent were allegedly already divided into vocation based social "classes" , including priests, nobles and others. Further, a racial segregation demarcated the local Muslim converts from foreign origin Muslims . The foreigners claimed a superior status as they were associated with the conquerors and categorized themselves as Ashraf ("noble"). Over time, the Indian Muslim society also allegedly split on the basis of the existing Hindu caste system. According to M. N. Srinivas (1986) and R.K. Bhattacharya, Indian Hindu converts to Islam brought their original caste system to the Muslim society in the region. On the other hand, Louis Dumont (1957) believes that the Islamic conquerors consciously adopted the Hindu caste system "as a compromise which they had to make in a predominantly Hindu environment."

Ziauddin Barani, an ethnic Indian 14th century political thinker of the Delhi Sultanate, recommended that the "sons of Mohamed" (i.e. Ashrafs) be given a higher social status than the low-born (i.e. Ajlaf). His most significant contribution in the fatwa was his analysis of the castes with respect to Islam. His assertion was that castes would be mandated through state laws or "Zawabi" and would carry precedence over Sharia law whenever they were in conflict. According to Barani, every act which is "contaminated with meanness and based on ignominity, comes elegantly [from the Ajlaf]". Barani also developed an elaborate system of promotion and demotion of Imperial officers ("Wazirs") that was primarily based on their caste. His opinions were not followed by his own Sultanate, as he accuses the Tughlaq Sultans of appointing "low-born" people to high offices, including Sultan Muhammad Shah, and Barani's own patron Sultan Firuz Shah in Delhi, who appointed a former slave captured and converted from Telangana as his Grand Vizier.

Historically, many Muslims from the julaha or weaver caste began to identify as "Ansaris", the butchers as "Quereshis", and the sanitation and bhishti caste Muslims as "Sheikh".

The Muslim concept of kafa'a/kufu/kafa'ah, which ulama use to support endogamy, provides a justification for South Asian Muslim caste practices. Kafa'ah is hereditary.

Ashrafization and Syedization 
Ashrafization includes adopting upper caste Muslims' practices to achieve social climbing. The Sayyid Dynasty of Khizr Khan of the Delhi Sultanate was founded by a Punjabi Muslim, who claimed Sayyid descent based on unsubtantiated evidence. The Barha Syeds who rose as king-makers of the Mughal Empire, originated from a marginal Indian peasant community of Muzaffarnagar who claimed Sayyid ancestry, although their claim to be true Syeds was generally not admitted. The Mughal Emperor Jahangir wrote that "some people make remarks about their lineage, but their bravery is a convincing proof of their being Sayyids". This showed that they had assimilated into Sayyid identity merely due to military service rather than through true descent.

Caste Associations 
Another type of Ashrafization is the establishment of caste associations to promote a community's interests and for, especially, social support. The Khoja caste, who are Ismaili Shias found particularly in Karachi and Sindh, are prominent in this regard. Other prominent Muslim caste associations are those of the Memons and the Bohras in Sindh and Gujarat.

History of research 
There are various definitions of the term caste, and therefore, various contested opinions on whether this term can be used to denote social stratification among non-Hindu communities, (e.g. Hindu Varna or classifications of the British Raj). Ghaus Ansari (1960) uses the term "caste" to describe the Muslim social groups with following characteristics: endogamy within a given social group, hierarchical gradation of social groups, determination of the group membership by birth, and, in some cases, association of an occupation with the social group.

Beginning in the 19th century, Western Indologists first catalogued the various Muslim castes:

 Henry Miers Elliot's Supplement to the glossary of Indian terms (1844), later amplified into Memoirs on the history, folk-lore, and distribution of the Races of the North Western Provinces of India
 John Charles Williams's The Report on the Census of Oudh (1869)
 Denzil Ibbetson's Census Report of Punjab (1883), later adapted into Panjab Castes
 John Nesfield's Brief View of the Caste System of the North-Western Provinces and Oudh (1885)
 Herbert Hope Risley's Tribes and castes of Bengal (1893)
 William Crooke's The tribes and castes of the North-western Provinces and Oudh (1896)

Nelson's book, in particular, included a whole chapter dedicated to the primarily British Raj Indologist derived neologism of Muslim "castes". In 20th-century British India, a number of works included the Muslim social groups in their descriptions of the Indian castes. These included H. A. Rose's A Glossary of the Tribes and Castes of the Punjab and North-West Frontier Province (1911).

In independent India, Ghaus Ansari (1960) initiated academic discussion over the neologism of Muslim "caste" system. Subsequently, Imtiaz Ahmed elaborated the topic in his Caste and Social Stratification among the Muslims (1973).

About 1915, Mirza Muhammad Hassan Qatil wrote about the four  (classes) of the Ashraf. He describes how people are considered to be  (contemptible) in the following occupations: elephant caretaking, bread business, perfume business, and businesses in bazaars.

Syedism, Ashrafism, Biradarism, Zatism, Sharifism, Arab Supremacy, and Divisions 
Zat is sometimes considered a broader category than Biradari. In Pakistani Punjab, being relatives is the main criterion to comprise a Biradari. The ranking, from highest to lowest, of Ashraf castes is the following: Syed, Gaur Muslims, and Mughals.

Ghaus Ansari (1960) named the following four broad categories of Muslim social divisions in India:

Ashraf, who claim foreign-origin descent.
e.g. Sayyid, Mughal
Converts from upper castes or Swarna.
e.g. Gaur Muslims , Rajput Muslims Muslim Jats 
Converts from other Indian Tribes.
e.g. Darzi, Dhobi, Mansoori, Gaddi, Faqir, Hajjam (Nai), Julaha, Kabaria, Kumhar, Kunjra, Mirasi, and Teli
Converts from untouchable castes.
e.g. Muslim Mochi, Bhangi

There is a hierarchy among Ashrafs that is determined by the degree of nearness to Muhammad and which country they originate from; accordingly the Syeds (who trace descent from Fatima, Muhammad's daughter) have the highest status.

The non-Ashrafs are categorized as Ajlaf. The untouchable Hindu converts are also categorized as Arzal ("degraded"). They are relegated to menial professions such as scavenging and carrying night soil.

B.R. Ambedkar, citing the Superintendent of the Census for 1901 for the Province of Bengal, mentions that the Ajlaf primarily include:
 Cultivating Sheikhs, and others who were originally Hindus but who do not belong to any functional group, and have not gained admittance to the Ashraf Community, e.g. Pirali and Thakrai.
 Darzi, Jolaha, Fakir, and Rangrez.
 Barhi, Bhalhiara, Chik, Churihar, Dai, Dhawa, Dhunia, Gaddi, Kalal, Kasai, Kula Kunjara, Laheri, Mahifarosh, Mallah, Naliya, Nikari.
 Abdal, Bako, Bediya, Bhal, Chamba, Dafali, Dhobi, Hajjam, Mucho, Nagarchi, Nal, Panwaria, Madaria, Tunlia.

For the Arzal, the following castes are mentioned by the Superintendent of the Census: Bhanar, Halalkhor, Hijra, Kasbi, Lalbegi, Maugta, Mehtar.

In Pakistan, various social groups (called ) display a social stratification comparable to the Indian caste system. The various  differ widely in power, privilege and wealth. Both ethnic affiliation (e.g. Within the bounds of endogamy defined by the above parameters, close consanguineous unions are preferred due to a congruence of key features of group- and individual-level background factors as well as affinities. McKim Marriott adds that a social stratification that is hierarchical, closed, endogamous, and hereditary is widely prevalent, particularly in western parts of Pakistan. The numerically and socially influential tribes in Pakistani Punjab includes the agricultural tribes of Arain, Awan, Jat Muslim and Gujjar as well as Rajput.

In Nepal, the castes of Muslims rank differs according to the criteria applied.

In India the Ajlaf comprise Qureshis, Ansaris, Saifis, and other groups of lower occupation.

The majority of ulemas (theologians/doctors of the law) are part of the Syed, and many Ashrafs are businessmen, landowners, and traders.

A "marriage circle" can be formed over an area, over which a zat panchayat (caste council) can have the authority, and where marriage alliances occur. 

A Syed's status is sometimes based more on male descendants and hypergamous marriage than bloodline purity.

The early Turks had subdivisions.

In the Rasum-i Hind, a textbook that was compiled by Master Pyare Lal in 1862, the four firqa (or subdivisions of the Ashraf) are explained, and nasl (lineage/pedigree) is elaborated:
 The ancestors of the Mughal caste are said to be descended from the Biblical Noah.
 The ancestors of the Pathans are said to be Israelites from when Solomon was alive.

In the ruling class of the Mughal Empire, Muslims were classified as native Hindustani, Afghan, Turani, and Irani.

Pakistani Punjab

Zamindars, Kammis, and the Seyp System 
Zamindars, which are landowning class, and Kammis, which are service providing castes, are status groups that are caste based that are found in a hierarchical system in Pakistani Punjabi villages. Kammi Quoms and Zamindar Quoms are rigid birth-based groups that are based on parentage occupations. In the Seyp System, which is contractual labor, the Kammis provide labor and services, and they receive favors, food, money, crops, and grains. Zamindars are considered to be a dominant caste, and leaders in the village and people who dominate affairs of the village tend to be Zamindars. Social, political, and economic affairs of the village are dominated by Zamindar Quoms in Pakistan, and land is controlled by Zamindar Quoms, while Kammi Quoms are socially marginalized and discriminated. Inter-Quom endogamy is found between Kammi Quoms and Zamindar Quoms. Ancestral land ownership and a parentage job being cultivation are what Punjabi Pakistanis ascribe to the Zamindar status.

"Zamindars", in modern-day Pakistani Punjabi villages, typically refer to a Quom that owns land and has an occupation of agriculture - Zamindari. There are some castes that are higher than the service providing castes and below the landowning castes.

Caste endogamy is found in Pakistan, with members of a Quom tending to marry within the Quom. In the rural parts of Pakistani Punjab, the lack of marriages between Kammi and Zamindar Quoms is vital to the caste system. Kammis include artisan, laborer, and service providing Quoms (such as barbers, cobblers, and carpenters).

A Kammi woman remarked how:

Quoms are highly influential in marriage practices. However, different Zamindar Quoms sometimes intermarry, and this may constitute a Biradari. A large majority of Kammis perform daily wage labour or low ranking tasks.

A study in a Pakistani Punjabi village found that in the Seyp (contractual relationships) between a Zamindar (landholding) family and Kammi (artisan castes) families, Kammi families give goods and perform services to the Zamindars, which give the Kammis grain; the Kammi families also perform some customary and ritual tasks: for example, the barber cooks in the Zamindar's house on special events and performs circumcisions.

Elections 
People also exhibit loyalty to their Quoms in elections. In Pakistani Punjab, Biradaris are the sole criteria in local bodies' elections. There are more Zamindars than Kammis in Pakistani Punjab. Including because of the high financial costs of running in an election, Kammis do not generally run in elections.

Bengal 
There are around 35 Muslim castes in Bengal. Muslim society is historically divided into 3 large groupings in Bengal, with the Sharif/Ashraf at the top, followed by the Atraf (low-born), and with the Arzal or Ajlaf at the bottom.

Other Muslim castes historically do not associate with Arzal castes. Lower castes historically are not allowed to enter mosques or be buried in the public burial ground.

Sharifism 
Sharifism refers to the special status given to claimants of prophetic nasab (also qarabah), which means "closeness", or being descended from Muhammad, Muhammad's Quraysh tribe, or Muhammad's family.

Discrimination

Representation 
In 20th century India, the upper-class (Ashraf) Muslims dominated the government jobs and parliamentary representation. As a result, there have been campaigns to include lower social classes among the groups eligible for affirmative action in India under SC and STs provision act.

Burial 
In India's Bihar state, higher caste Muslims have opposed lower caste Muslims being buried in the same graveyard.

Cooking 
A study in a Pakistani village found that a caste-like hierarchy exists in the Muslim community of the village. The sweeper group is ranked the lowest. The other Muslim communities do not allow the sweepers to touch the cooking vessels of the upper ranking groups of Muslims.

Racial and historical 
Barani also explained at one point how Turkish sultans discriminated against Muslims of local descent. He explains how Iltutmish discriminated against low birth Muslims by letting go 33 of them from the government. Additionally, Iltutmish appointed Jamal Marzuq to the post of Mutassarif of Kanauj; Aziz Bahruz disagreed due to low birth status, which resulted in Marzuq no longer being the Mutassarif. Low born people were not allowed to be in the post of mudabbiri or khwajgi, and they also could not be eligible for an iqta recommendation.

Balban prevented low-birth people from being in important offices, and he also criticized how Kamal Mohiyar was selected for mutassarif of Amroaha. A letter by Sayyid Ashraf Jahangiri explains how Balban thoroughly researched the ancestry of every single one of his government servants and officers; he had genealogists meet in Delhi to ascertain these ancestries.

Tughlaq had a policy of giving "preference to foreign born Muslims in administration and government" and "systematically ignored the claims of Indian Muslims". Sayyid Ashraf Jahangiri explains how:

Historians and Urdu writers (including Masood Alam Falahi) have explained how discrimination of Ashraf Muslims towards lower caste Muslims and Dalit Muslims was often disguised under claims of class and "" (family line) values among Uttar Pradesh Muslims.

See also

Caste system among South Asian Christians
Caste system in India
Islam in India
Pasmanda Muslim Mahaz
Social class in the United Kingdom
Social class in the United States

References

Citations

Bibliography

Notes
A.

Further reading
 
 
 
 
 
 
 

Muslims
Islam in India
Islam in Pakistan
Islam in South Asia
Islam in Nepal
Social class in India
Discrimination in India
Discrimination in Pakistan
Discrimination in Bangladesh
Discrimination in Nepal
Discrimination in Sri Lanka
Caste-related violence in India
Caste system in Nepal
Caste